Steve Gilmour (born 16 October 1986) is a former Australian professional cricketer. Gilmour made his first-class debut late in the 2008–09 season. He was contracted to the Victorian Bushrangers with the squad number 30  for the 2011/12 Australian cricket summer

References

Living people
1986 births
Australian cricketers
Victoria cricketers
Cricketers from Victoria (Australia)